Épaule du Marboré is a pyrenean summit, culminating at  in the Monte Perdido Range, marking the Franco-Spanish border. It lies on the Greenwich meridien.

Geography

Topography 
The Tour du Marboré forms part of the range above Cirque de Gavarnie. It marks the border between the Pyrenees National Park of France and the Ordesa y Monte Perdido National Park of Spain.

On the French side, it is located in the commune of Gavarnie in the canton of Luz-Saint-Sauveur, Hautes-Pyrénées department, Midi-Pyrénées region.

References 

Mountains of the Pyrenees
Mountains of Hautes-Pyrénées
Mountains of Aragon
Pyrenean three-thousanders